Henry Matthews (1789 – 20 May 1828) was a Puisne Justice of the Supreme Court of Ceylon and the sixth Advocate Fiscal of Ceylon. He was appointed on 1 November 1821, succeeding Ambrose Hardinge Giffard, and held the office until 1829. He was succeeded by William Norris.

References

Attribution

Attorneys General of British Ceylon
Puisne Justices of the Supreme Court of Ceylon
1789 births
1828 deaths
British Ceylon judges